Microbulbifer mangrovi is a polysaccharide-degrading bacterium isolated from an Indian mangrove, hence its name. It is rod-shaped, Gram-negative, non-motile, aerobic and non-endospore forming, its type strain designated DD-13(T).

References

Further reading

Whitman, William B., et al., eds. Bergey's manual® of systematic bacteriology. Vol. 5. Springer, 2012.

External links
LPSN
Type strain of Microbulbifer mangrovi at BacDive -  the Bacterial Diversity Metadatabase

Alteromonadales
Bacteria described in 2013